Evergreen Memorial Park & Crematory is a cemetery in the East Side neighborhood of Boyle Heights, Los Angeles, California.

Evergreen has several prominent individuals of historical Southern California on its grounds. Many pioneers are interred here, names such as Bixby, Coulter, Hollenbeck, Lankershim, Van Nuys, and Workman. There are politicians, notably former Mayors of Los Angeles. The Garden of the Pines section of the cemetery is a memorial to Japanese Issei pioneers.

History
Established on August 23, 1877, Evergreen is the oldest, and one of the largest, extant cemeteries in the city with over 300,000 interments. The section near 1st and Lorena streets was at one time a potter's field.

Evergreen is notable for never having banned African-Americans from being buried at the cemetery. It has sections for Armenians, Japanese, and early white settlers, and a large section of Mexican graves.

Burials 
Although Evergreen had established burial sites for different ethnicities, they were still segregated from one another. First-generation Japanese, called Issei, had established a burial site on the grounds. In 1949, a memorial for the 442nd Regimental Combat Team was incorporated and remembered for the Japanese-American soldiers who had fallen during World War II. Every year during the Obon festival, families gather to keep up their relatives' tombstones and to visit the spirits.

Biddy Mason, nurse and philanthropist, was one of the well known figures to be buried at the cemetery, in 1891. There is a section called the “Showmen’s Rest” in which 400 carnival workers and circus performers are buried by a memorial that is decorated with a lion. It was established by the Pacific Coast Showmen’s Association in 1922. One presumed serial killer, Bertha Bielstein, at one time lay in Evergreen Cemetery; however she was buried under another name, Olga Miller. Bielstein came from an upper middle class family in Pittsburgh, Pennsylvania. She was suspected of killing her parents in their home and moving to Los Angeles after escaping from a mental institution. Later her identity was confirmed and her body was relocated back east.

Potter's field 
In return for a zoning variance to permit the cemetery, the founders of Evergreen gave the City of Los Angeles a  parcel of the proposed cemetery in 1877 for use as an indigent graveyard, often referred as a "Potter's field."
Ownership of the indigent cemetery passed from the City to the County of Los Angeles in 1917. At the time, it was clear the potter's field would have burial space for only a few more years. By 1924, burial space in the potter's field was exhausted and the county built a crematorium at the site, on the corner of Lorena and 1st streets, and began to cremate its indigent deceased.

Evergreen Cemetery purchased most of the  potter's field from the county in 1964. Only the crematorium was retained by the county. In 2007, the cremated remains of over 1700 unclaimed bodies were buried in the cemetery.

Chinese in the potter's field 

Until the Civil Rights era, racism barred the Chinese from burying their dead in most cemeteries, including Evergreen. The only place that allowed burial of Chinese persons was the city's potter's field. Unlike white indigents, who were buried at no charge, the Chinese had to pay US$10 (HK$78) to be interred.

The Chinese community was allowed to utilize a corner of the potter's field and soon after, in September 1888, erected a shrine. Evergreen left the shrine in place when it purchased the potter's field from the county in 1964 and let it fall into disrepair over the years. The shrine and the land under it were eventually purchased by the Chinese Historical Society of Southern California in 1992 and restored soon after. It is now a registered historic monument.

By the time the county took ownership of the potter's field in 1917, it was clear it was running out of space, so the Chinese community responded by purchasing land and in 1922 opening the Chinese Cemetery. The county saw this as an opportunity to extend the useful life of the potter's field. Norman Martin, Superintendent for the County Department of Charities, wrote to Chan Kai Sing, Secretary of the Chinese Chamber of Commerce. In a letter, dated June 19, 1923, he wrote:

"Recently your people established a new Chinese cemetery on East 1st Street, and it would be highly desirable if the bodies buried in the county cemetery could be transferred to your new location."

Despite acknowledging there were 902 Chinese buried at the site, and that each grave had cost the Chinese US$10, Martin wanted the remains moved to the new cemetery and offered $2 per body as compensation, "The idea being that you would move all of the bodies as fast as practicable."

During the summer of 2005, the Los Angeles County Metropolitan Transportation Authority Metro construction workers widening First Street for the Metro L Line light rail extension uncovered the skeletal remains of 174 people buried near the south side of the Los Angeles County Crematorium, adjacent to Evergreen Cemetery. Archaeologists working for the agency determined that the excavation site was likely the Chinese section of the potter's field. The majority of the remains were Asian males found along with rice bowls, jade bracelets, Chinese burial bricks, Asian coins and opium pipes. The remains were buried inside Evergreen Cemetery, near the Chinese Shrine, and a memorial was dedicated on March 7, 2010.

Memorial Day 
Since 1897, Evergreen has held festivities every Memorial Day. Veterans, activist groups and families enter the cemetery grounds. Military organizations are stationed at different places as the Veterans Drum Corps lead the way from the streets, and Medal of Honor wreaths are distributed to the gravesites. Sometimes guest speakers are invited to make speeches.

Jogging track 
With only a few open areas in Boyle Heights, the Evergreen Jogging Path Coalition worked with city officials to bring together a fitness area to improve local health. In 2003, a 1.4 mile jogging track was completed, encircling the cemetery. The track has exercise stations, shade, and benches so people from around the metro area can exercise regularly. as part of the Eastside Access Project which assists in building easier paths to the metro stations and accessible tracks for fitness. The path was dedicated in the memory of local activist, Lloyd Monserratt.

In 2016 it received new additions and updated facilities.

Notable interments

Eddie Anderson (1905–1977), comedic actor, played Rochester, Jack Benny's valet

James Banning (1900–1933), pioneering African American aviator
Florence Barker (1891–1913), stage and silent film actress
Charlotta Bass (1874–1969), educator, publisher and civil rights activist
Louise Beavers (1902–1962), actress
Matthew "Stymie" Beard (1925–1981), actor
Jesse Belvin (1932–1960), singer and songwriter
Jotham Bixby (1831–1917), father of Long Beach
Frank Braxton (1929–1969), pioneering African-American animator and director
Kate Brousseau (1862–1938), chair of the Psychology Department at Mills College
Everett Brown (1902–1953), actor

Donaldina Cameron (1869–1968), social reformer
Charles A. Canfield (1848–1913), pioneer oilman in California and Mexico.
Alonzo "Lonnie" Clayton (1876–1917), youngest jockey to ever win the Kentucky Derby.

Pearlretta DuPuy (1871–1939), musician.

Mary Foy (1862–1962), first female head librarian of the Los Angeles Public Library

Katherine Grant (1904–1937), silent film actress
 John Strother Griffin (1816–1898), pioneer physician and the founder of East Los Angeles
 LtC John Franklin "Frank" Godfrey (1839–1885), Civil War veteran, Indian Wars veteran, Los Angeles city attorney in 1876.

Joe Hayashi (1920–1945), Medal of Honor recipient
Henry T. Hazard (1844–1921), 28th Mayor of Los Angeles
John Edward Hollenbeck (1829–1885), businessman and investor who was involved in the 19th century development of Los Angeles and of Nicaragua

Charles Price Jones (1865–1949), minister, composer and founder of the Church of Christ (Holiness)

Isaac Lankershim (1818–1882), German-born American landowner and pioneer in California
Gilbert W. Lindsay (1900–1990), Los Angeles City Councilman
Biz Mackey (1897–1965), Baseball Hall of Famer of the Negro leagues
Bridget "Biddy" Mason (1818–1891), former slave, nurse, real estate entrepreneur
Tōyō Miyatake (1896–1979), photographer and documenter of the Japanese American internment
Sadao Munemori (1922–1945), Medal of Honor recipient
Kiyoshi K. Muranaga (1922–1944), Medal of Honor recipient

Bobby Nunn (1925–1986), singer
Jimmie Noone (1895–1944), clarinetist

Samuel Marshall Perry (1836–1898), Los Angeles City councilman and County supervisor
William Hayes Perry (1832–1906), lumber baron, first president of LADWP

Frederick Madison Roberts (1879–1952), California Assemblyman
Earl Rogers (1869–1922), attorney
George Ralphs (1850–1914) businessman

Nyogen Senzaki (1876–1958), Zen monk and teacher
William J. Seymour (1870–1922), religious leader
Edward F. Spence (1832–1892), 25th Mayor of Los Angeles
Johnny St. Cyr (1890–1966), musician
Dora A. Stearns (1883–1942), ran for State Senator in 1923

Ted T. Tanouye (1919–1944), Medal of Honor recipient
Cameron E. Thom (1825–1915), 24th Mayor of Los Angeles, co-founder of Glendale, California
James R. Toberman (1836–1911), 19th and 23rd Mayor of Los Angeles
Misak Torlakian  (1892–1968), assassin of Behbud Khan Javanshir
Benjamin Cummings Truman (1835–1916), writer
Hsi Tseng Tsiang (1899–1971), writer of novels, poetry, and plays, self-trained actor

Isaac Newton Van Nuys (1836–1912), banker, real estate developer, founder of Van Nuys
Gary Vinson (1936–1984), actor

Phillip Walker (1937–2010), electric blues guitarist
Kenny Washington (1918–1971), professional American football player
Guilford Wiley Wells (1840–1909), U.S. Congressman
Joseph Pomeroy Widney (1841–1938), 2nd president of USC, co-founder of Church of the Nazarene
Boyle Workman (1868–1942), politician and businessman, son of William H. Workman
William H. Workman (1839–1918), 26th Mayor of Los Angeles

 Hugo Zacchini (1898–1975) daredevil, "human cannonball", artist
 Otto J. Zahn (1871–1965), Los Angeles City Council member

References

External links

 
Chinese burials at KCET-TV online

Cemeteries in Los Angeles
Boyle Heights, Los Angeles
History of Los Angeles
1877 establishments in California
19th century in Los Angeles
Cemeteries established in the 1870s